Laurence Manfredi (born 20 May 1974 in Gap, Hautes-Alpes) is a French shot putter.

She finished fifth at the 2007 European Indoor Championships. She also competed at the World Championships in 1997, 1999 and 2003 and the Olympic Games in 2000 and 2004 without reaching the final round.

Manfredi has been a dominating figure in the national competitions – a win at the 2010 French Indoor Championships was the 30th national title of her career.

Her personal best throw is 18.68 metres, achieved in July 2000 in Castres.

Competition record

References

1974 births
Living people
People from Gap, Hautes-Alpes
French female shot putters
Athletes (track and field) at the 2000 Summer Olympics
Athletes (track and field) at the 2004 Summer Olympics
Lesbian sportswomen
French LGBT sportspeople
LGBT track and field athletes
Olympic athletes of France
Mediterranean Games silver medalists for France
Athletes (track and field) at the 2005 Mediterranean Games
Sportspeople from Hautes-Alpes
Mediterranean Games medalists in athletics